The  is a four-axle B-B wheel arrangement diesel-hydraulic locomotive type operated in Japan since 2014 by West Japan Railway Company (JR West).

Operations
The KiYa 143 locomotives are used as self-propelled snowplough units during the winter season, replacing ageing JNR Class DD15 and JNR Class DE15 locomotives, and for hauling non-revenue services during other periods with the snowploughs removed.

Design
The KiYa 143 locomotives use the same  diesel engines and braking systems as JR West's KiHa 189 series diesel multiple unit (DMU) trains.

History
The first KiYa 143, KiYa 143-1, was delivered from Niigata Transys in February 2014. This was followed by KiYa 143-2 in March 2014.

Fleet status
, nine KiYa 143 locomotives were in operation, allocated as follows.

Classification
While technically a diesel locomotive, the KiYa 143 is classified by JR West according to its diesel multiple unit (DMU) numbering scheme.

References

External links

 JR West press release (February 2014) 

Diesel locomotives of Japan
West Japan Railway Company
Bo-Bo locomotives
1067 mm gauge locomotives of Japan
Railway locomotives introduced in 2014
Niigata Transys rolling stock